This is a list of English football transfers for the 2006–07 season. Only moves from the Premiership and Championship, as well as any other prominent moves from the lower leagues are listed.

The summer transfer window ran from the end of the 2005–06 season, with a few transfers taking place prior to the season's complete end, the first prominent move went through on 2 May. The window closed on 31 August. The mid-season transfer window opened on 1 January 2007, and ran for the entire month, until 31 January. Players without a club may join one, either during or in between transfer windows. Clubs below Premiership level may also sign players on loan at any time. If need be, clubs may sign a goalkeeper on an emergency loan, if all others are unavailable.

Chelsea broke the record for the highest transfer fee paid by an English club, as well as their own transfer record when they paid £30 million for Andriy Shevchenko, slightly eclipsing the £29.1 million Manchester United paid for Rio Ferdinand in 2002. It also became the sixth highest costing transfer of all time. Dietmar Hamann's transfer to Bolton Wanderers became the shortest in English footballing history, with him only being at the club for one day, before having a "change of heart" and joining Manchester City the following day. In total, Premiership clubs spent the highest amount on transfers in the summer since the transfer window system was introduced.

Summer transfer window
Clubs are English unless noted

See also 
List of English football transfers Summer 2007

Notes and references

External links
Transfers – May 2006 BBC Sport. Retrieved on 3 January 2007
Transfers – June 2006 BBC Sport. Retrieved on 3 January 2007
Transfers – July 2006 BBC Sport. Retrieved on 3 January 2007
Transfers – August 2006 BBC Sport. Retrieved on 3 January 2007
Transfers – January 2007 BBC Sport. Retrieved on 3 January 2007

Transfers
Summer 2006
English